Séverine Loyau (born 6 December 1973 in Nevers) is a French sprint canoeist who competed in the mid-1990s. At the 1996 Summer Olympics in Atlanta, she finished ninth in the K-2 500 m event.

References
 Sports-Reference.com profile

External links
 

1973 births
Canoeists at the 1996 Summer Olympics
French female canoeists
Living people
Olympic canoeists of France
People from Nevers
Sportspeople from Nièvre